Alexander was launched in France or Spain in 1797, probably under another name, and taken in prize circa 1799, when she was lengthened and raised. She was registered at Liverpool in 1801 and proceeded to make six voyages as a slave ship. She then sailed to Brazil and the West Indies and was last listed in 1809.

Career
Alexander first appeared in Lloyd's Register (LR) in 1800.

 
Captain Joseph Threlfall acquired a letter of marque on 8 October 1799.

1st slave voyage (1799–1800): Captain Threlfall sailed from Liverpool on 29 October 1799. Alexander acquired her slaves at Bonny and arrived at Kingston, Jamaica on 8 July 1800 with 310 slaves. She had left Liverpool with 51 crew members and she suffered 12 crew deaths on her voyage.

Captain John Ainsworth acquired a letter of marque on 6 August 1801.

2nd slave voyage (1801–1802): Captain Ainsworth sailed from Liverpool on 5 September 1801. Alexander acquired her slaves at Bonny and arrived at Grenada on 3 April 1802 with 322 slaves. She may also have delivered some at Suriname. She sailed from Grenada or Suriname via Antigua, and arrived back at Liverpool on 15 June. She had sailed from Liverpool with 48 crew members and she suffered four crew deaths on her voyage.

3rd slave voyage (1802–1803): Captain Ainsworth sailed from Liverpool on 18 September 1802. Alexander acquired her slaves on the Windward Coast, in the area between Rio Nuñez and the Assini River. She arrived at Demerara on 1 March 1803. She returned to Liverpool on 31 May. She had left Liverpool with 37 crew members and she suffered four crew deaths on the voyage.

Captain Henry Ward acquired a letter of marque on 14 February 1804.

4th slave voyage (1804–1805): Captain Ward sailed from Liverpool on 7 April 1804. Alexander started acquiring her slaves on the Gold Coast on 27 May. She arrived at Demerara on 23 November with 338 slaves. She left Demerara on 26 January 1805 and arrived back at Liverpool on 13 April. She had left with 52 crew members, and eight died on the voyage.

5th slave voyage (1805–1806): Captain Ward sailed from Liverpool on 12 August 1805. Alexander acquired her slaves on the Gold Coast and left Africa on 8 February 1806. She arrived Kingston on 22 March 1806 with 336 slaves. She left Kingston on 2 May and arrived at Liverpool on 11 June. She had left Liverpool with 52 crew embers and suffered eight crew deaths on the voyage.

6th slave voyage (1807–1808): Captain Ward sailed from Liverpool in February 1807. As she left, on 12 February another vessel ran afoul of her in the Mersey, causing some damage, carrying away all of her upper work on the starboard side of her quarterdeck. Alexander acquired her slaves on the Gold Coast and arrived at Kingston on 30 November. Alexander recaptured Lucy, which then arrived in Jamaica. Alexander departed Kingston on 11 April 1808 and arrived back at Liverpool on 29 May. She had left Liverpool with 50 crew members and she suffered eight crew deaths on the voyage.

The Slave Trade Act 1807 made it illegal for British vessels to engage in the slave trade. The Act took effect on 1 May 1807, so Alexanders last voyage was still legal as she had cleared customs outward bound in February.

Fate
Alexander, Ward, master, was last listed in 1808 in LR, and in 1809 in the Register of Shipping.

Citations

1797 ships
Captured ships
Age of Sail merchant ships of England
Liverpool slave ships